Café Atlantico is the seventh album by the Cape Verdean singer-songwriter Cesária Évora.  Café Atlantico is a reference to her home where she frequently entertained guests.

Track listing 
 "Flôr di nha esperança"
 "Vaquinha Mansa"
 "Amor di mundo"
 "Paraiso di atlantico"
 "Sorte"
 "Carnaval de São Vicente"
 "Desilusão dum amdjer"
 "Nho antone escaderode"
 "Beijo de longe"
 "Roma criola"
 "Perseguida"
 "Maria Elena"
 "Cabo verde mandá manténha"
 "Terezinha"

Charts

Certifications

References

External links 
 
 
 Lusafrica Productions
 Critical review of the album (Spanish)

1999 albums
Cesária Évora albums